Pseudathyma endjami is a butterfly in the family Nymphalidae. It is found in Cameroon, the Central African Republic and the Democratic Republic of the Congo.

References

Butterflies described in 2002
Pseudathyma